() is the triconsonantal Semitic root of many Arabic and some Hebrew words. Many of those words are used as names. The basic meaning expressed by the root is "to praise" in Arabic and "to desire" in Hebrew.

Usage

Concepts

Arabic
Hamd — "praise", a song or poem in praise of Allah.
Mahmad — "desire, desirable thing, pleasant thing, beloved, goodly, lovely, pleasant, desirable, precious ones, precious things, precious treasures, treasures, valuable".
Mahmud — "desirable, precious thing, pleasant thing".

Hebrew
Hemda חֶמְדָּה — "desire, delight, beauty".
Nehmad נֶחְמָד — "nice, cute, pleasant, lovely".
Hamud חָמוּד — "cute, lovely, sweet, pretty".
Mahmad מַחְמָד — "something desirable", as in Hayat Mahmad חַיַּת מַחְמָד "pet" ("desirable animal"), Mahmad Eino מַחְמַד עֵינוֹ "someone's beloved" ("desire of his eyes").
Hemed חֶמֶד — "grace, charm".
Hamad חָמַד — "desired, coveted", as in Lo Tahmod לֹא תַחְמֹד "Thou shalt not covet".

Names
Ahmed — highly praised, 
Hamid — [the one] given praise
Muhammad/Mahmud — praiseworthy
‘Abd al-Hamid — servant of the Most Praised
Hamoudi חֲמוּדִי — (Hebrew colloquial name, lit. 'cutie')
Hemed חֶמֶד — a village in Gush Dan, Israel

References

Triconsonantal roots